Dame Deborah Jane Bronnert  (born 31 January 1967) is a British diplomat who has served as British Ambassador to Russia since 2020.

Career
Educated at Featherstone High School, Middlesex, Bronnert went up to the University of Bristol where she read Mathematics and graduated as BSc. She then pursued further studies in the Political Economy of Russia and Eastern Europe at University College London's School of Slavonic and East European Studies, receiving a MA degree. 

Bronnert entered HM Civil Service in 1989, working for the Department of the Environment before being posted to the EEC UK representation in Brussels 1991–93. She then joined the Foreign and Commonwealth Office (FCO) and was posted to Brussels again 1995–99. She served in Moscow and various other posts at the FCO, before becoming British Ambassador to Zimbabwe 2011–14. Promoted Director-General, Economic and Global Issues at the FCO in 2017, she was appointed Ambassador to Russia in January 2020.

Bronnert was appointed Companion of the Order of St Michael and St George (CMG) in the 2012 Birthday Honours and Dame Commander of the Order of St Michael and St George (DCMG) in the 2023 New Year Honours for services to British foreign policy.

See also
 List of ambassadors of the United Kingdom to Russia

References

1967 births
Living people
Alumni of the University of Bristol
Alumni of the UCL School of Slavonic and East European Studies
British women ambassadors
Ambassadors of the United Kingdom to Zimbabwe
Ambassadors of the United Kingdom to Russia
Dames Commander of the Order of St Michael and St George